This is a list of listed buildings in the parish of Inverness and Bona (outwith the burgh of Inverness) in Highland, Scotland. For listed buildings within Inverness burgh, see List of listed buildings in Inverness.

List 

|}

Key

See also 
 List of listed buildings in Inverness
 List of listed buildings in Highland

Notes

References
 All entries, addresses and coordinates are based on data from Historic Scotland. This data falls under the Open Government Licence

Inverness And Bona
Buildings and structures in Inverness